Olegario Molina Solís (6 March 184328 April 1925) was a Mexican lawyer, businessman and politician who served as the governor of Yucatan from 1902 to 1907 and the secretary of development, colonization and industry in the government of Porfirio Diaz from 1907 to 1911. He was also a member of the Chamber of Deputies in two terms. His brother were a journalist Audomaro Molina Solís and a historian Juan Francisco Molina Solís.

He was the most conspicuous character of the so-called Divine Caste, a term used by General Salvador Alvarado to designate the Yucatecan oligarchy of the early twentieth century or, more precisely, the group of hacendados henequeneros, or porfiriato henequenero, who controlled the state economy of Yucatán at that time.

Molina Solís died in exile in Havana, Cuba in 1925.

References 

1843 births
Politicians from Campeche
19th-century Mexican lawyers
Mexican businesspeople
Governors of Yucatán (state)
Members of the Chamber of Deputies (Mexico)
1925 deaths
Exiled Mexican politicians